This Is Me is the ninth studio album by Americancountry music artist Randy Travis, released on April 26, 1994, by Warner Bros. Producer Kyle Lehning, Travis, and A&R Martha Sharp considered more than 1,000 songs before settling on the final ten. The tracks "Before You Kill Us All", "Whisper My Name", "This Is Me", and "The Box" were all released as singles, peaking at #2, #1, #5, and #8, respectively, on the Billboard country music charts. "Small Y'all" was later recorded by George Jones on his 1998 album It Don't Get Any Better Than This.

Track listing

Personnel

 Dennis Burnside - keyboards
 Larry Byrom - acoustic guitar, electric guitar, slide guitar
 Mark Casstevens - acoustic guitar
 Bruce Dees - background vocals
 Jerry Douglas - dobro
 Paul Franklin - steel guitar
 Steve Gibson - electric guitar
 Doyle Grisham - steel guitar
 Jim Hoke - soprano saxophone, tenor saxophone
 Sherilyn Huffman - background vocals
 David Hungate - bass guitar
 Chris Leuzinger - acoustic guitar
 Paul Leim - drums
 Larrie Londin - drums
 Brent Mason - electric guitar
 Suzi Ragsdale - background vocals
 Tom Roady - percussion
 Hargus "Pig" Robbins - piano
 Kayton Robbins - steel guitar
 John Wesley Ryles - background vocals
 Darrell Scott - background vocals
 Lisa Silver - background vocals
 Hank Singer - fiddle
 Jay Spell - electric piano
 Harry Stinson - drums
 Verlon Thompson - background vocals
 Randy Travis - lead vocals
 Dianne Vanette - background vocals
 Cindy Richardson-Walker - background vocals
 Billy Joe Walker Jr. - electric guitar
 Biff Watson - acoustic guitar
 Dennis Wilson - background vocals
 Curtis Young - background vocals

Chart performance

References

1994 albums
Randy Travis albums
Warner Records albums
Albums produced by Kyle Lehning